A Case of Rape is a 1974 American made-for-television drama film directed by Boris Sagal and starring Elizabeth Montgomery, Ronny Cox, and William Daniels. It premiered on NBC on February 20, 1974.  The film tells the story of a wife and mother who is raped twice by the same man and her ordeals dealing with the actual rape and her subsequent dealing with the police and the trial.

Plot
Ellen Harrod appears to have a happy marriage to David, although his frequent work-related absences are beginning to take a toll on her.  While taking night school classes with her neighbor and best friend, Marge Bracken, she is introduced to Larry Retzliff.

Ellen and Marge accept a ride home from Retzliff the same night while David is away. Once Ellen is in her apartment, Retzliff arrives claiming car trouble and asks to use the phone. When Ellen lets him in, he overpowers and rapes her. Unable to reach David by phone, and emotionally unable to report the crime, Ellen decides to put the attack behind her, and tries through three showers to literally wash away the rape.

When David returns, she is still unable to get his attention long enough to tell him about the attack. Having had an anonymous blood test, Ellen makes a serious effort to forget the attack and resume her life.  This attempt comes to a crashing halt four days after the initial attack in a parking garage when Retzliff, who has been waiting for Ellen behind the front seat of her car, rapes her again, this time beating her viciously.

After reporting the attack, the treatment that Ellen receives from the police, doctors, and detectives is anything but sympathetic.  While the District Attorney, Leonard Alexander, appears to have her best interests at heart, he clearly has his reservations.

Defending Retzliff is ruthless attorney Muriel Dyer who bullies and interrogates witnesses and Ellen herself on the stand in an attempt to get Retzliff off. Dyer's efforts succeed and Retzliff is found not guilty. Following the trial, attorney Alexander comments, "Never try a rape case unless your victim is a 90-year-old nun with at least four stab wounds." After this, Retzliff mockingly apologizes to Ellen, saying "no hard feelings", but Ellen calmly but coldly tells him, "If you ever come near me again, I'll kill you."

A voiceover narration at the end of the movie reveals that shortly after the trial, Retzliff attempts to rape someone else. While trying to escape from the police, he is shot and wounded, and ends up pleading guilty to the rape and sentenced to prison. Ellen and David's marriage is strained by the events of the film, and the narration reveals that Ellen later files for divorce.

Cast

Elizabeth Montgomery as Ellen Harrod
Ronny Cox as David Harrod
William Daniels as Leonard Alexander / Narrator
Cliff Potts as Larry Retzliff
Rosemary Murphy as Muriel Dyer
Patricia Smith as Marge Bracken
Ken Swofford as Detective Riley
Jonathan Lippe as Detective Parker
Sandy Kenyon as Mike Bracken
Alex Henteloff as Alex
Robert Karnes as Judge
Mario Gallo as Photographer
Antony Carbone as Officer Carbone
Davis Roberts as Officer Kane
Tom Selleck as Stan

Broadcast
The film was broadcast on February 20, 1974, over the NBC Television Network, which had some reservations about showing the second rape scene, which was considered strongly graphic at the time. As reported by the A&E series Biography, Montgomery believed so strongly in the story that she threatened to leave the project if the scene was cut. Montgomery prevailed, and the film was shown in its entirety along with warnings of the mature subject matter.

This was the second issue-oriented TV-movie of its time, following the 1973 CBS tv film Cry Rape starring Andrea Marcovicci, and helped to change human rights and legislation for rape victims. It was NBC's highest rated TV-movie in history with a Nielsen rating of 33.1 and an audience share of 49%.

Awards
Montgomery, who had become a household name during her eight-year tenure on Bewitched, received an Emmy nomination for her performance.

References

External links
 
 A Case Of Rape at the 26th Primetime Emmy Awards
 TV Fiction sticks close to fact at The New York Times

1970s American films
1970s English-language films
1974 films
1974 television films
American courtroom films
American crime drama films
American drama television films
Films about rape
Films directed by Boris Sagal
Films set in Los Angeles
NBC network original films